This list of writing awards is an index to articles about notable awards for writing other than literary awards. It includes general writing awards, science writing awards, screenwriting awards and songwriting awards.

General

Science writing awards

Screenwriting awards for film

Screenwriting awards for television

Songwriting awards

See also

 Lists of awards
 List of journalism awards
 List of literary awards
 List of media awards

References

 
 
 
 
Science writing awards
Writing